The 2012 Woking Borough District Council election was held on 3 May 2012 to elect members of the Woking Borough Council. Of the 12 available seats, the Conservative Party and the Liberal Democrats tied by winning six seats each.

Election result

Ward results

The election in Maybury and Sheerwater was voided by the Election Commissioner Richard Mawrey on petition. The subsequent by-election was won by the Conservatives.

References

2012 English local elections
2012
2010s in Surrey